Georgy Pfeiffer also Yurii or Yury Pfeiffer (23 December 1872, Sokirincy, Poltava Governorate, Russian Empire – 10 October 1946 Kiev, Ukrainian SSR, USSR) was a Russian Imperial and Soviet mathematician of German origin. Pfeiffer was known as a specialist in the field of integration of differential equations and systems of partial differential equations. He was also interested in algebraic geometry.

He was an Invited Speaker of the International Congress of Mathematicians (ICM) in 1908 at Rome, in 1928 at Bologna, and in 1932 at Zurich. He was a chairman of the Academic Council of the Faculty of Physics and Mathematics at the University of Kiev, Russian Empire. Pfeiffer was also attached to the Institute of Mathematics of the Academy of Sciences of the Ukrainian SSR in Kiev and served as Director during two periods, namely 1934 to 1941 and again from 1944 until his death in 1946. In the three years 1941–44, Pfeiffer was in Ufa, Russia the capital of the republic of Bashkortostan in western Russia. In Ufa, Pfeiffer was Director of the Institute of Mathematics and Physics.

References

External links
Biography 

Soviet mathematicians
Ukrainian mathematicians
Mathematical analysts
19th-century mathematicians from the Russian Empire
1872 births
1946 deaths
People from Chernihiv Oblast
People from Poltava Governorate
Taras Shevchenko National University of Kyiv alumni
Academic staff of the Taras Shevchenko National University of Kyiv
Academic staff of Kyiv Polytechnic Institute
NASU Institute of Physics
NASU Institute of Mathematics
Burials at Lukianivka Cemetery